"Salad days" is a Shakespearean idiom referring to a period of carefree innocence, idealism, and pleasure associated with youth. The modern use, chiefly in the United States, describes a heyday, when a person is/was at the peak of their abilities, while not necessarily a youth.

History
The phrase is attributed to William Shakespeare, who made the first known use of it in his 1606 play Antony and Cleopatra. In the speech at the end of Act One in which Cleopatra is regretting her youthful dalliances with Julius Caesar she says, "...My salad days, / When I was green in judgment, cold in blood/To say as I said then!"

The phrase became popular only from the middle of the 19th century, coming to mean "a period of youthful inexperience or indiscretion." The metaphor comes from Cleopatra's use of the word 'green'—presumably meaning someone youthful, inexperienced, or immature. Her references to "green" and "cold" both suggest qualities of salads.

Fowler's Dictionary of Modern English Usage summarizes several other possible meanings of the metaphor:

"Whether the point is that youth, like salad, is raw, or that salad is highly flavoured and youth loves high flavours, or that innocent herbs are youth's food as milk is babes' and meat is men's, few of those who use the phrase could perhaps tell us; if so, it is fitter for parrots' than for human speech."

Usage

Queen Elizabeth II used the phrase during her Silver Jubilee royal address in 1977, referring to her vow to God and her people when she made her 51st birthday broadcast: "Although that vow was made in my salad days, when I was green in judgment, I do not regret nor retract one word of it."

The phrase has been used as the title of several books, including novels by Theodora Benson, Françoise Sagan, and Charles Romalotti; Douglas Fairbanks Jr.'s autobiography The Salad Days; and numerous cookbooks.

Paul Greenberg in "Tuna's End", his 2010 The New York Times Magazine article wrote: "Aboard one Zodiac, Frank Hewetson, a 20-year Greenpeace veteran who in his salad days as a protester scaled the first BP deepwater oil rigs off Scotland, tried to direct his pilot toward the net so that he could throw a daisy chain of sandbags over its floating edge and allow the bluefin to escape."

In film, television, and modern theatre 
Salad Days is a British musical by Julian Slade and lyricist Dorothy Reynolds. It premiered in the UK at the Bristol Old Vic in June 1954, and transferred to the Vaudeville Theatre in London on August 5, 1954. One of its songs, "The Time of My Life," includes the lyrics, "We're young and we're green as the leaf on the tree / For these are our salad days."

A sketch from Monty Python's Flying Circus is called "Salad Days," and features a parody of Slade's musical as interpreted by Sam Peckinpah.

Salad Days is the name of a documentary film released in 2014 about the evolving punk and hardcore scene in Washington DC during the 1980s and 1990s. The choice of name hints at the 1985 Salad Days (EP) by the Washington DC band Minor Threat.

The 2010 Taiwanese drama Gloomy Salad Days is named after the expression.

In music

Album and song titles

Procol Harum has a song on their eponymous debut album titled "Salad Days (Are Here Again)."

In 1985, Washington, D.C., hardcore punk band Minor Threat released the song "Salad Days," reflecting on days of spirited youth in contrast to a time of adult disillusionment.

Adrian Belew's 1999 album, Salad Days, consists of acoustic recordings of solo work as well as songs from his King Crimson era.
Punk rock collective Bomb the Music Industry! have a song titled "Unlimited Breadsticks, Soup and Salad Days" on their 2007 album Get Warmer.

The pop-punk/emo band Misser has a song called "Goddamn Salad Days" from their 2013 EP Distancing.

Canadian musician Mac DeMarco's second album, released in 2014, is titled Salad Days.

"Salad Days" is a song by the Cardiff post-punk band Young Marble Giants, including the lyric "Think of salad days, they were folly and fun, they were good, they were young."

In song lyrics

The phrase is used in the Spandau Ballet song "Gold": "These are my salad days, slowly being eaten away."

The idiom is used again in the opening line of the track "Lovers Who Uncover" by The Little Ones: "Where do all the lovers meet with one another, in an effort to uncover what has happened to their salad days?"

The phrase is also used in the track "Spotlight (Oh Nostalgia)" from Patrick Stump's Truant Wave EP: "Oh, nostalgia I don't need you anymore / 'Cause the salad days are over and the meat is at my door."

Frank Zappa's song "Electric Aunt Jemima" contains the phrase as well: "Holiday and salad days, and days of moldy mayonnaise."

Dave Carter and Tracy Grammer use the phrase in the song "Frank to Valentino," on the album When I Go.

Talib Kweli's song "Friends & Family" on his album Gutter Rainbows uses the phrase in reference to his early career: "Rhyming in Greenwich Village circa 1993 / Yeah those were the salad days, my career's appetizer." His song "Ms. Hill" on his album Right About Now uses the phrase, saying, "We used to kick it in the salad days, but she look at me like she don't know me when she see me nowadays."

The Manhattan Transfer uses the phrase in their song, "Zoo Blues" which is featured on their 1987 album Brasil.

The phrase is also used in the chorus of the track "Vince The Loveable Stoner" from The Fratellis's Costello Music album: "And I haven't seen a pupil in his eyes for 16 days, the Catholic girls love him in a hundred million different ways, and he's been up for days, in a thick malaise, he's only listened to the salad days."

In Modest Mouse's song "Guilty Cocker Spaniels," Isaac Brock sings: "Salad days add up to daily shit".

The song "What Would Jimi Do?" on bassist Tony Levin's album Resonator begins with the lyric "Lately, I've been thinking back, back into my salad days."

Cursive uses the phrase on the last song of their 2006 release Happy Hollow.

Geddy Lee refers to the phrase in Rush's 2010 documentary called Beyond the Lighted Stage.

Green Day's song "¡Viva la Gloria!" uses the phrase: "You made your bed in salad days amongst the ruins."

The Finn Brothers song "Edible Flowers" from 2004's Everyone Is Here album features the line "Taste the edible flowers scattered in the salad days."
Desaparecidos' song "City on the Hill" from their 2015 record Payola includes the lyric: "All the stolen melodies they played in the hit parade / all the borrowed spirituals they fade in the salad days."

Brand New's song "Waste" from their 2017 record Science Fiction includes the lyric: "You and I were stuck in the waste / Talking about our salad days / What a damn lie."
Deep Purple's single "Any Fule Kno That" from their 1998 album Abandon contains the lyric "Salad days go a-tickling by / Have a high time, burn money in the meantime."

References

External links

 Dictionary.com entry
 World Wide Words discussion of 'Salad Days' usage, original and modern

English-language idioms
Metaphors referring to food and drink
Shakespearean phrases
Antony and Cleopatra